Elaine Storkey (née Lively; born 1944) is an English philosopher, sociologist, and theologian. She is known for her lecturing, writing and broadcasting.

Early years and education
Born Elaine Lively on 1 October 1944, Storkey is the eldest of the three children of James and Anne Lively. She grew up in Ossett, Yorkshire, and was Head Girl at Ossett Grammar School (now Ossett Academy), whose former pupils included the novelist Stan Barstow,  a friend of her parents, and the artist twins: Donald and Peter Heywood. Her brother Philip Lively has lectured in universities in Japan, Oman, and the United Arab Emirates, her sister, Elizabeth Slacum lives in Maryland, US, and her brother-in-law, Richard Slacum is a director of international development who has worked throughout Africa, Asia, and the Middle East. Elaine studied at the University of Wales, Aberystwyth, doing postgraduate work in philosophy at McMaster University, Hamilton, Ontario, Canada, and York University, England.

In 1968 she married Alan Storkey, an economist, writer and lecturer, and they have three sons.

Working life
After research on Ludwig Wittgenstein's work, Storkey's first academic post was in philosophy in Oxford University, as a tutor at Manchester College, Oxford.

She left Manchester College to join her husband on the faculty of the University of Stirling. She started broadcasting with the BBC in 1986, after they both returned from a period of lecturing at Calvin College, Michigan, and Covenant College, Tennessee, in the United States. She has since been involved in many documentaries, arts, news and current affairs programmes. She was a presenter on BBC Radio 4's Thought for the Today for more than 20 years and has written many scripts for the BBC World Service. She currently broadcasts regularly with BBC Radio Ulster, especially Sunday Sequence. Elaine Storkey has authored several books, including What's Right with Feminism, The Search for Intimacy and Mary's Story, Mary's Song. She has also been a member of the General Synod of the Church of England from 1987 to 2016, serving on the Archbishop's Rural Commission and the Cathedrals Commission. For many years she wrote for The Independent and for the Swedish newspaper Dagen and for the Church Times. During the 1990s she collaborated with Roman Catholic author and theologian Margaret Hebblethwaite, and they co-authored a book exploring Christian feminism from two different traditions. Their writings on women are widely used within the Roman Catholic as well as other churches. Storkey was also a close colleague of the biblical scholar Catherine Clark Kroeger, whose obituary she wrote in July 2011.

After many years teaching and writing with the Open University and presenting radio and television documentaries on gender, race, and ethnicity with colleague Stuart Hall, Storkey succeeded John Stott as Executive Director of the London Institute for Contemporary Christianity (LICC) in 1991, a post she held until 1999. She contributed to Stott's obituary in 2011. She also taught at King's College London. In 1997 she became President of Tearfund, a Christian relief and development charity, and has since been involved in monitoring aid, relief and advocacy work in countries of the Global South. In 2010 she and her husband Alan became founder members of Restored, an organisation committed to advocating against violence to women.

Storkey has served on many other boards and councils, including the Crown Nominations Commission, the environmental agency A Rocha, the global advocacy group Micah Challenge, and as Vice President of the University of Gloucestershire. She is currently President of Fulcrum, a Church of England think-tank. She holds a Lambeth DD degree an honorary PhD from the University of Gloucestershire, and is a Fellow of Aberystwyth University.

Storkey's Created or Constructed grew out of lectures given at the University of New South Wales in Australia. From 2003 to 2006, she was a colleague of Alister McGrath as Senior Research Fellow at Wycliffe Hall, Oxford, and remained there until 2007. In 2007, 12 members of the academic staff resigned, critical of the leadership of the college principal, Richard Turnbull. At an employment tribunal in 2008, the college admitted lack of compliance with employment law and was ordered to pay compensation. Turnbull was removed from his post in 2012. Storkey continues to teach on the Christian Mind course at Oxford University, and has been a lecturer with the Montgomery Trust since 2001. She became a member of High Table at Newnham College, Cambridge, in January 2008. From February 2009 to September 2012 she was Director of Education and Training for the Church of England's Church Army, in conjunction with York St John University. In the summer of 2009 she held a Templeton-Cambridge Fellowship in Journalism and was Chair of The Church and Media network from 2010 to 2012. Among the public lectures she has given recently are the Frumentius Lectures, in Addis Ababa, Ethiopia, the Annual Barnardo Lecture, the "Global Gender Lectures" for the Cymru Institute, the Oliver Lyseight Annual Memorial Lecture, lectures on "Creative Christianity in Popular Culture" at Dordt College, US, the All Saints Lecture, the Kuyper Lecture in Princeton USA, and lectures on film and theology.  She has been a regular speaker at the Greenbelt Festival. A fuller list of lectures can be found on the author's webpage. Many lectures, including archived ones, are on video and available publicly on social media. She has been a member of the Emerging Markets Symposium, and The Power Shift Forum for Women in the World Economy.

Storkey has lectured across the world, including in Haiti, India, Nepal, Turkey and Ethiopia, and is a prominent feminist evangelical. Her writings have brought a biblical perspective to the feminist movement. She is concerned to highlight the impact of climate change and global poverty, as well as of sexual violence, on women. She has visited many African countries and been involved in advocacy, with strong links to Heal Africa in the Democratic Republic of the Congo. Her widely acclaimed book Scars Across Humanity: Understanding and Overcoming Violence Against Women was published in November 2015. The second edition, published by IVP Academic in the US in 2018, won the Christianity Today Book of the Year Award 2019, for Politics and Public Life.

Awards and honours
Storkey was given a lifetime achievement award for services to women by the American group CBE in 2008, and in 2013 her alma mater, Aberystwyth University, honoured her with a University Fellowship. In April 2016 she received the Abraham Kuyper Prize from Princeton Theological Seminary, in recognition of her work as a scholar, writer and journalist.

Personal life
Alan and Elaine Storkey have three sons and six grandchildren. Amos James m. Helen Shelley 1994, Matthew Emmanuel Milton (1974) m. Annie Watson 1999, Caleb Alexander Titus (1977) m. Kerry Lewis 2008. The grandchildren are five grandsons and a granddaughter.

Published works
Books
 What's Right with Feminism, SPCK, 1985
 Mary's Story, Mary's Song, Harper-Collins, 1993
 Magnify the Lord, HarperCollins, 1996
 The Search for Intimacy, Hodder Headline, 1994
 Conversations on Christian Feminism, with Margaret Hebblethwaite, Harper-Collins, 1999
 Created or Constructed: The Great Gender Debate, Paternoster Press, 2000
 The Origins of Difference, Baker Book House, 2002
 Word on the Street, Old Hall Press, 2005
 Scars Across Humanity, SPCK, November 2015 revised 2018
 Women in a Patriarchal World, SPCK, April 2020

Other publications
 "The Production of Social Divisions", Social Sciences: A Foundation, Open University Press, 1985.
 "Sex and Sexuality in the Church", Mirror to the Church, Editor Monica Furlong, SPCK, 1986.
 Faith in the Countryside, Report of the Archbishops', Commission on Rural Areas, co-author, 1990
 "Modernity and Anthropology", in Philip Sampson, Vinay Samuel and Chris Sugden (eds), Faith and Modernity, Lynx, 1994
 "Dooyeweerd's Anthropology – The Male-Female Dimension", in Sander Griffioen, Bert M. Balk (eds), Christian Philosophy at the Close of the Twentieth Century, Assessment and Perspective, Uitgeverij kok Kampen, 1995
 "Sexuality and Spirituality", in David Torrance, Family, Sexuality and Spirituality, Hansel Press, 1997
 "A Commentary – New Testament Study Bible", with Catherine Kroeger and Mary Evans, CUP, 2002
 "Theology and Gender", in A Cambridge Companion to Evangelical Theology, CUP, 2008.
 "Religion and Sustainability in Global Perspective" in Sustainability in Crisis, edit Colin Bell, Wordpress 2013

References

External links
 
 
 storkey.info - The Homepage for Elaine and Alan Storkey.

1943 births
Academics of the Open University
Academics of the University of Stirling
Alumni of Aberystwyth University
Christian feminist theologians
Church Army people
English evangelicals
English feminist writers
English philosophers
English women non-fiction writers
Evangelical Anglican theologians
Fellows of Harris Manchester College, Oxford
Fellows of Wycliffe Hall, Oxford
Feminist philosophers
Holders of a Lambeth degree
Living people
McMaster University alumni
People from Wakefield